This article provides details of international football games played by the Abkhazia national football team from 2020 to present.

Results

2020

2021

2022

Record by opponent

See also
 Abkhazia national football team results (unofficial matches)
 Abkhazia national football team results (2012–2019)

References

Football in Abkhazia